The Afterlife is an American memoir written by Donald Antrim. The book became a finalist for the National Book Critics Circle award in 2007.

The memoir's primary theme is Antrim's torturous relationship with his alcoholic, manipulative, and mentally ill mother, Louanne Antrim (née Self).    Relationships with other members of the author's family are explored, but all of these relationships are presented as essentially subordinate to Antrim's relationship with his mother.

Early versions and original publications
Black Mountain, 1977  
I Bought A Bed
A.K.A. Sam  
Ad Nauseam  
Church 
The Kimono 
A Man in the Kitchen

References

American memoirs